This article lists important figures and events in the public affairs of British Malaya during the year 1929, together with births and deaths of prominent Malayans.

Incumbent political figures

Central level 
 Governor of Federated of Malay States and Unfederated of Malay States, Governor of Straits Settlements: Sir Hugh Clifford

State level 
  Perlis :
 Raja of Perlis : Syed Alwi Syed Saffi Jamalullail
  Johore :
 Sultan of Johor : Sultan Ibrahim Al-Masyhur
  Kedah :
 Sultan of Kedah : Sultan Abdul Hamid Halim Shah
  Kelantan :
 Sultan of Kelantan : Sultan Ismail
  Terengganu :
 Sultan of Terengganu : Sultan Sulaiman Badrul Alam Shah
  Selangor :
 British Residents of Selangor : James Lornie
 Sultan of Selangor : Sultan Alaeddin Sulaiman 
  Penang :
 Residents-Councillor : Meadows Frost
  Malacca :
 Residents-Councillor : 
Bertram Walter Elles (to 6 April) 
Cecil Harry George Clarke (from 6 April) 
  Negri Sembilan :
 British Residents of Negri Sembilan :
 James William Simmons
 Yamtuan Besar:  Tuanku Muhammad Shah ibni Almarhum Tuanku Antah
   Pahang :
 British Residents of Pahang : Charles Francis Joseph Green
 Sultan of Pahang : Sultan Abdullah al-Mu’tasim Billah
  Perak :
 British Residents of Perak :
 Henry Wagstaffe Thomson  
 Charles Walter Hamilton Cochrane
 Sultan of Perak : Iskandar

Events 
3 June – Ala'Iddin Sulaiman Shah, Sultan of Selangor, is designated Honorary Knight Grand Cross by King George V of the United Kingdom in the 1929 Birthday Honours.
date unknown – John Archibald Russell begins growing Boh tea in the Cameron Highlands, starting Malaya's tea industry.

Births
 22 March – P. Ramlee, actor, filmmaker, musician, and composer (died 1973)
 25 March – Abdul Hamid Omar, first Chief Justice of Malaysia (died 2009)
 5 April – David E. L. Choong, badminton player (died 2011)
 25 August – Salleh Abas, judge and politician (died 2021) 
 18 December – Yeoh Tiong Lay, Malaysian businessman (died 2017)

Deaths

See also
 1929
 History of Malaysia

References

1920s in British Malaya
Malaya